Berend Jan "Bé" Udink (12 February 1926 – 24 May 2016) was a Dutch politician and diplomat of the defunct Christian Historical Union (CHU) party now merged into the Christian Democratic Appeal (CDA) party and businessman.

Udink applied at the Rotterdam School of Economics in July 1946 majoring in Economics and obtaining a Bachelor of Economics degree in June 1948 before graduating with a Master of Economics degree in June 1952. Udink also applied at the University of Lausanne in August 1946 for a Class in Financial economics obtaining a Bachelor of Accountancy degree in September 1947. Udink worked as a corporate director of the Chamber of commerce of Rotterdam from October 1953 until July 1962. Udink also worked as an associate professor of Trade economics at the Rotterdam School of Economics from June 1959 until September 1964. Udink worked as corporate director of the Chamber of commerce of The Hague from July 1962 until April 1967 serving as executive director from January 1963 until April 1967. Udink served on the Rijnmond Council from September 1965 until April 1967.

After the election of 1967 Udink was appointed as Minister for Aid to Developing Countries in the Cabinet De Jong, taking office on 5 April 1967. After the Leader of the Christian Historical Union and Parliamentary leader of the Christian Historical Union in the House of Representatives Jur Mellema unexpectedly announced that he was stepping down as Leader of the Christian Historical Union, the Christian Historical Union leadership approached Udink as his successor, Udink accepted and became the Leader of the Christian Historical Union and Lijsttrekker (top candidate) for the election of 1971 on 20 June 1970. The Christian Historical Union suffered a small loss, losing 3 seats and now had 7 seats in the House of Representatives. Udink was subsequently elected as a Member of the House of Representatives and became the Parliamentary leader in the House of Representatives, taking office on 11 May 1971. The following cabinet formation of 1971 resulted in a coalition agreement between the Christian Historical Union, the Catholic People's Party (KVP), the People's Party for Freedom and Democracy (VVD), the Anti-Revolutionary Party (ARP) and the Democratic Socialists '70 (DS'70) which formed the Cabinet Biesheuvel I with Udink appointed as Minister of Housing and Spatial Planning, taking office on 6 July 1971. On 28 July 1971 Udink announced that he was stepping down as Leader in favor of Parliamentary leader and predecessor Mellema. The Cabinet Biesheuvel I fell just one year later on 19 July 1972 and continued to serve in a demissionary capacity with Udink taking over as Minister of Transport and Water Management on 21 July 1972 until it was replaced by the caretaker Cabinet Biesheuvel II with Udink continuing as Minister of Housing and Spatial Planning and Minister of Transport and Water Management, taking office on 9 August 1972. In September 1972 Udink announced his retirement from national politics and that he wouldn't stand for the election of 1972. The Cabinet Biesheuvel II was replaced by the Cabinet Den Uyl following the cabinet formation of 1972 on 11 May 1973.

Udink retired from national politics and became active in the private sector, in August 1973 Udink was appointed as Chief financial officer (CFO) and Vice Chairman of the Board of directors of the Overseas Gas and Electric Company (OGEM) from 1 September 1973 until 1 January 1978. In December 1977 Udink was nominated as Chief executive officer (CEO) and Chairman of the Board of directors of Overseas Gas and Electric Company working from 1 January 1978 until 1 March 1980.

Udink remained active in the private sector and public sector and occupied numerous seats as a corporate director and nonprofit director on several boards of directors and supervisory boards (Zilveren Kruis, Transnational Institute,  Radio Netherlands Worldwide, Energy Research Centre, Stichting IKEA Foundation and Terre des hommes) and served on several state commissions and councils on behalf of the government (Public Pension Funds APB, Staatsbosbeheer, Council for Culture, Cadastre Agency and the Advisory Council for Spatial Planning) and served as an diplomat and lobbyist for several economic delegations on behalf of the government.

Udink was known for his abilities as a negotiator and debater. Udink continued to comment on political affairs until his death at the age of 90.

Biography

Early life
Berend Jan Udink was born on 12 February 1926 in Deventer in the Province of Overijssel in a Remonstrant family. Udink studied economy in Rotterdam and Lausanne (1945–1952). After his studied he was employed at the Chamber of Commerce of Rotterdam and later worked as a teacher at the Economische Hogeschool Rotterdam (Economic College of Rotterdam). Udink, who belonged to the Christian Historical Union, was elected in the so-called Rijnmondraad (Council of Rijnmond), a local council of representatives of Rijnmond, in 1965.

Politics
Two years later, in 1967, he became minister for Development Cooperation in the Cabinet-De Jong, a post he held till 1971. In 1971 he was lijsttrekker of the CHU, presenting himself as a conservative and a "law and order" politician. In that same year Udink became minister of Transport, Public Works and Water Management in the Cabinets-Biesheuvel I and II. His political career ended in 1973. From 1973 till 1978 he was member of the Board of Directors of the Overzeese Gas- en Elektriciteitsmaatschappij N.V. (as Dutch gas and electricity company) and from 1978 till 1980 he served as its president.

Personal
Bé Udink was married and had three children. He belonged to the Remonstrant Brotherhood (Arminian Protestant Church).

Decorations

References

External links
Official

  Drs. B.J. (Bé) Udink Parlement & Politiek

1926 births
2016 deaths
Businesspeople from Rotterdam
Christian Historical Union politicians
Commanders of the Order of Orange-Nassau
Dutch chief executives in the manufacturing industry
Dutch chief executives in the oil industry
Dutch corporate directors
Dutch expatriates in Switzerland
Dutch lobbyists
Dutch nonprofit directors
Dutch nonprofit executives
Erasmus University Rotterdam alumni
Academic staff of Erasmus University Rotterdam
Grand Officers of the Order of Leopold II
Knights Commander of the Order of Merit of the Federal Republic of Germany
Leaders of the Christian Historical Union
Members of the House of Representatives (Netherlands)
Ministers for Development Cooperation of the Netherlands
Ministers of Housing and Spatial Planning of the Netherlands
Ministers of Transport and Water Management of the Netherlands
People from Deventer
People from Goedereede
Politicians from Rotterdam
Remonstrants
University of Lausanne alumni
20th-century Dutch businesspeople
20th-century Dutch diplomats
20th-century Dutch economists
20th-century Dutch educators
20th-century Dutch politicians